The 2003 Nigerian House of Representatives elections in Federal Capital Territory was held on April 12, 2003, to elect members of the House of Representatives to represent Federal Capital Territory, Nigeria.

Overview

Summary

Results

Abaji/Gwagwalada/Kwali/Kuje 
Party candidates registered with the Independent National Electoral Commission to contest in the election. PDP candidate Yusuf Baban Takwa won the election.

Amac/Bwari 
Party candidates registered with the Independent National Electoral Commission to contest in the election. ANPP candidate Philips Tanimu Aduda won the election.

References 

Federal Capital Territory House of Representatives elections
2003 elections in Nigeria
April 2003 events in Nigeria